21S rRNA (uridine2791-2'-O)-methyltransferase (MRM2 (gene), mitochondrial 21S rRNA methyltransferase, mitochondrial rRNA MTase 2) is an enzyme with systematic name S-adenosyl-L-methionine:21S rRNA (uridine2791-2'-O-)-methyltransferase. This enzyme catalyses the following chemical reaction

 S-adenosyl-L-methionine + uridine2791 in 21S rRNA  S-adenosyl-L-homocysteine + 2'-O-methyluridine2791 in 21S rRNA

The enzyme catalyses the methylation of uridine2791 of mitochondrial 21S rRNA.

References

External links 
 

EC 2.1.1